Cambucha is a studio album by Latin percussion artist Milton Cardona. It was released in 1999.

Track listing

References

1999 albums
Jazz albums by American artists